Park Hee-sung (Hanja: 朴熙成; born 7 April 1987) is a South Korean footballer who plays as midfielder for Seongnam FC in the K-League.

Club career
Park was selected in the priority pick of the 2011 K-League Draft by Gwangju FC.

References

External links 

1987 births
Living people
South Korean footballers
Gwangju FC players
K League 1 players
K League 2 players
Association football midfielders